Johnson-Sauk Trail State Recreation Area is an Illinois state park on  in Henry County, Illinois, United States. The park also has a  lake (Johnson Lake) with various types of fish. The park has many trails, and a campground. Ryan's round barn has a tour every year in the park. Near the round barn, is a scenic  pond which is a great place to hike to.

References

State parks of Illinois
Protected areas of Henry County, Illinois